The Kachin State National Congress for Democracy (KNCD) is a political party in Myanmar.

History
Following the reintroduction of multi-party democracy after the 8888 Uprising, the party was established in 1988. The party contested nine seats in the 1990 general elections, receiving 0.11% of the vote and winning three seats; U G. Bawn Hlan in Chiphwe, U Zau Ein in Sumprabum and U Oo Byit Tu in Myitkyina 2.

The party was banned by the military government on 6 March 1992. However, it was later re-established, and boycotted the 2010 elections.

References

Political parties in Myanmar
1988 establishments in Burma
Political parties established in 1988